Customer feedback management (CFM) online services are web applications that allow businesses to manage user suggestions and complaints in a structured fashion. A 2011 study conducted by Aberdeen Group showed that companies using customer feedback management services and social media monitoring have a 15% better customer retention rate.

Methodology 
Various online CFM services use different approaches. The aim of most methodologies is to measure customer satisfaction, with some models also measuring related constructs including customer loyalty and customer word-of-mouth (see Webreep model). The methodology behind each service has an important impact on the nature of the service itself, and is the main differentiator between them. The main feedback management methodologies are listed below.

Feedback analytics
Feedback analytics services use customer generated feedback data to measure customer experience and improve customer satisfaction. Feedback data is collected, then, using key performance indicators and feedback metrics, turned into actionable information for website improvement. Feedback analytics services provide website owners with the ability to create feedback forms that can be customized to fit the website and placed on all pages. This allows the website's users to submit feedback when they encounter a problem or have a feature request. A feedback button is visible at all times on each of the site's pages. Feedback analytics provide page- and website- level actionable data, and enable a website owner to read and manage feedback, as well as to get back to the users. The feedback is only made accessible to the website owner. This means that websites using feedback analytics are not exposed to the potential harm to their brand that feedback made public may cause. Feedback collection can be passive (using a feedback button), or active (using a feedback form set to appear in certain conditions), or both.  The ability to choose the location of the button, as well as the frequency and conditions of the pop-up make feedback analytics a relatively non-intrusive approach from the point of view of the website user. Due to its measurable nature, feedback analytics data can be integrated with web analytics data, allowing website owners to understand what their users are doing on their site (using web analytics) and why they do it (using feedback analytics), in one single interface.

Customer feedback optimization
Also referred to as review forum optimization or RFO. Similar to SEO, CFO is the process of affecting the visibility of select web pages or results in the natural or un-paid results of various customer feedback management services or online review forums. CFO stands for customer feedback optimization, thus the sites being optimized are those for the review, ranking, and giving feedback of goods and or services by customers. In recent years review forums or customer feedback management services have been growing rapidly in influence, with 83% of consumers saying online reviews influence their perception of a company.
 In addition, a study states that, consumers were willing to pay between 20 percent and 99 percent more for an Excellent (5 star) rating than for a Good (4 star rating), depending on the product category.

Some commonly known review forums are Yelp (20 million visits in February 2013), Trip Advisor (10 million visits in February 2013), Travelocity (3.7 million visits in February 2013), and Angie's List (3.4 million visits in February 2013).

Feature comparison 
Below is a comparison of notable customer feedback management services.

Legend:
 Who voted: displays the users who voted on an item, but not each user's vote
 Human friendly URLs: /product/Suggestion_name. Human-unfriendly URLs: /akira/dtd/6320-2416, /pages/general/suggestions/7841
 Merge suggestions: more than deleting duplicate suggestions, merging adds votes from the merged suggestion into the main one
 Custom URL: DNS aliasing  a subdomain like feedback.mycompany.com to the subdomain of the online feedback service (e.g. mycompany.cfmsite.com)

See also 
 Customer experience
 Enterprise feedback management
 Interactive customer evaluation

References 

Customer experience